Wynyard railway station may refer to:

Wynyard railway station (England), a former station in County Durham, England
Wynyard railway station (Saskatchewan), a former station in Wynyard, Saskatchewan, Canada
Wynyard railway station, Sydney, New South Wales, Australia